"Burn Baby Burn" is a poem by American poet Marvin X, X wrote the poem shortly after the Watts Rebellion in 1965 to convey the oppression black people faced in white America.

References

American poems
Watts, Los Angeles